The Stonewall Jackson and Robert E. Lee Monument, often referred to simply as the Jackson and Lee Monument or Lee and Jackson Monument, was a double equestrian statue of Confederate generals Stonewall Jackson and Robert E. Lee, formerly located on the west side of the Wyman Park Dell in Charles Village in Baltimore, Maryland, alongside a forested hill, similar to the topography of Chancellorsville, Virginia, where Stonewall Jackson and Robert E. Lee met before the Battle of Chancellorsville in 1863. The statue was removed on August 16, 2017, on the order of Baltimore City Council, but the base still remains. The monument is in storage and some city council members have called for all Confederate monuments in the state to be destroyed. 

The area surrounding the old monument was rededicated as Harriet Tubman Grove in March 2018.

Significance
The Jackson and Lee Monument was the first double equestrian statue in the United States. Artist Laura Gardin Fraser was the only woman sculptor selected out of five other men to create the monument. Notable architect John Russell Pope was commissioned to design the base of the monument.

Background
Funding for the statue was secured by Colonial Trust Company owner J. Henry Ferguson before he died in 1928. Ferguson provided $100,000 for the erection of the monument. It was dedicated in 1948 in a ceremony at which Governor William Preston Lane Jr. and Mayor Thomas D'Alesandro Jr. (the father of Nancy Pelosi) spoke.

The monument was located on the west side of the Wyman Park Dell along Art Museum Drive from its dedication until its removal by the Baltimore City Government.

Removal

After the 2015 Charleston church shooting, Mayor Stephanie Rawlings-Blake organized a commission to evaluate removal of the city's four confederate monuments. In January 2016, the commission decided that the Jackson and Lee Monument, along with the Roger B. Taney Sculpture by William Henry Rinehart in Mount Vernon Place would be removed.

On August 14, 2017, the Baltimore City Council voted unanimously to deconstruct these two monuments along with the Confederate Soldiers and Sailors Monument and the Confederate Women's Monument.  The Jackson and Lee Statue was subsequently removed by Whiting Turner construction on August 16, 2017, but the base remains intact. Activists replaced the monument with a rendition of a pregnant African-American woman, created by artist Pablo Machioli, which was destroyed shortly thereafter. The pedestal was also repeatedly vandalized with politically motivated graffiti.

Inscription
The base of the sculpture featured the following inscription:
SO GREAT IS MY CONFIDENCE IN / GENERAL LEE THAT I AM WILLING TO / FOLLOW HIM BLINDFOLDED / STRAIGHT AS THE NEEDLE TO THE POLE / JACKSON ADVANCED TO THE EXECUTION / OF MY PURPOSE
(West steps:) THE PARTING OF GENERAL LEE AND / STONEWALL JACKSON ON THE EVE / OF CHANCELLORSVILLE
(East steps:) GIFT OF J. HENRY FERGUSON OF MARYLAND.
(North steps:) THEY WERE GREAT GENERALS AND/ CHRISTIAN SOLDIERS AND WAGED / WAR LIKE GENTLEMEN.

See also
 List of Confederate monuments and memorials
 List of public art in Baltimore
 New Orleans Confederate monuments removal
 Removal of Confederate monuments and memorials
 Roger B. Taney Monument (Baltimore)

References

1948 sculptures
Bronze sculptures in Maryland
Buildings and structures demolished in 2017
Outdoor sculptures in Baltimore
Charles Village, Baltimore
Equestrian statues in Maryland
Landmarks in Baltimore
Sculptures of men in Maryland
Statues in Maryland
Tourist attractions in Baltimore
Confederate States of America monuments and memorials in Maryland
Statues of Robert E. Lee
Lee Monument
Removed Confederate States of America monuments and memorials
Vandalized works of art in Maryland
Relocated buildings and structures in Maryland